The madman theory is a political theory commonly associated with United States President Richard Nixon's foreign policy. Nixon and his administration tried to make the leaders of hostile Communist Bloc nations think he was irrational and volatile. According to the theory, those leaders would then avoid provoking the United States, fearing an unpredictable American response. 

Some international relations scholars have been skeptical of madman theory as a strategy for success in bargaining. One study found that madman theory is frequently counterproductive, but that it can be an asset under certain conditions.

History
In 1517, Niccolò Machiavelli had argued that sometimes it is "a very wise thing to simulate madness" (Discourses on Livy, book 3, chapter 2). However, in Nixon's Vietnam War, Kimball argues that Nixon arrived at the strategy independently, as a result of practical experience and observation of Dwight D. Eisenhower's handling of the Korean War.

In his 1962 book, Thinking About the Unthinkable, futurist Herman Kahn argued that to "look a little crazy" might be an effective way to induce an adversary to stand down.

Richard Nixon
Nixon's chief of staff, H. R. Haldeman, wrote that Nixon had confided to him:

I call it the Madman Theory, Bob. I want the North Vietnamese to believe I've reached the point where I might do anything to stop the war. We'll just slip the word to them that, "for God's sake, you know Nixon is obsessed about communism. We can't restrain him when he's angry—and he has his hand on the nuclear button" and Ho Chi Minh himself will be in Paris in two days begging for peace.

In October 1969, the Nixon administration indicated to the Soviet Union that "the madman was loose" when the United States military was ordered to full global war readiness alert (unbeknownst to the majority of the American population), and bombers armed with thermonuclear weapons flew patterns near the Soviet border for three consecutive days.

The administration employed the "madman strategy" to force the North Vietnamese government to negotiate an end to the Vietnam War. In July 1969 (according to a CIA report declassified in February 2018), President Nixon may have suggested to South Vietnamese president Thieu that the two paths he was considering were either a nuclear weapons option or setting up a coalition government.

Several American diplomats, staff members, friends, and family, knew Nixon indulged in alcohol and had trouble battling insomnia, for which he was prescribed sleeping pills. According to Ray Price, he sometimes took them together. This affected his acuity and understanding of his surroundings on several occasions; from John Ehrlichman calling him "looped", to Manolo Sanchez, a Republican operative and special counsel to the President, thinking Nixon had a stroke or heart attack while on the phone with him, to not being able to pick up a telephone call from the British prime minister during the Mideast crisis. Both Nixon's daughter Julie Nixon Eisenhower and friend Billy Graham acknowledged this fact, after his presidency. Nixon also took dilantin, recommended by Jack Dreyfus. That medicine is usually prescribed for anti-seizure attacks, but in Nixon's case it was to battle depression. Also, Henry Kissinger portrayed the 1970 incursion into Cambodia as a symptom of Nixon's supposed instability.

Donald Trump

Some have characterized former US President Donald Trump's behavior towards allies and hostile states as an example of madman theory. For instance, during the KORUS FTA renegotiations Trump told US trade negotiators to warn South Korean diplomats that "if they don't give the concessions now, this crazy guy will pull out of the deal", which Jonathan Swan of Axios characterized as a "madman" approach to international relations. 

Jonathan Stevenson argued in The New York Times that Trump's strategy could have been less effective than Nixon's because Nixon tried to give the impression that "he'd been pushed too far, implying that he would return to his senses if the Soviets and North Vietnamese gave in", whereas the North Korean government was unlikely to believe that "Trump would do the same" because his threats were "standard operating procedure", not a temporary emotional reaction. International relations scholar Roseanne W. McManus argued that Trump stating that he was relying on madman theory made the approach counterproductive, as he was undermining the belief that his "madness" was genuine.

Vladimir Putin

Another example of madman theory has also been attributed to Russian president Vladimir Putin, especially in the lead up and during the 2022 Russian invasion of Ukraine. In 2015, Martin Hellman stated that "nuclear weapons are the card that Putin has up his sleeve, and he's using it to get the world to realise that Russia is a superpower, not just a regional power." This use of the madman theory, Hellman argued, was something which the West had not "properly caught on to."

In 2022, days before the Russian invasion of Ukraine, Gideon Rachman argued in the Financial Times that Putin's "penchant for publishing long, nationalist essays" regarding Ukrainian and Russian history, his plans of nuclear weapons exercises as well as his image of "growing increasingly out of touch and paranoid" and isolation during the COVID-19 pandemic, could have been the use of madman strategy. Rachman stated that Putin "is ruthless and amoral. But he is also shrewd and calculating. He takes risks, but he is not crazy", comparing Putin's recent actions to his more "rational" actions of the previous 20 years. However, Rachman also noted that "the line between acting like a madman and being a madman is disconcertingly thin."

In the first days of the invasion, Paul Taylor of Politico also speculated that Putin was using the madman strategy, after his decision to place Russian deterrence nuclear forces on "special alert". Taylor stated that Putin was exhibiting "pathological behavior" by "swinging wildly from seeming openness to negotiations to a full-scale invasion of Ukraine in four fronts, while threatening the world with mass destruction." Taylor also referred to Putin's television address prior to the invasion, stating that "his branding Ukraine’s elected leaders as drug-addicted neo-Nazis raised doubts even among supportive Russians about his mental state and health."

Research
Political scientist Scott Sagan and the historian Jeremi Suri criticized the theory as "ineffective and dangerous," citing the belief that the Soviet leader Brezhnev did not understand what Nixon was trying to communicate, and considering the chance of an accident from the increased movements of U.S. forces. President Trump's alleged use of the theory with North Korea has been similarly criticized, suggesting the chance of an accident arising from North Korea's string of missile testing was also increased. Stephen Walt has argued that not many successful cases of madman theory can be found in the historical record. McManus has argued that some forms of "madness" can be an asset in bargaining, whereas other forms are counterproductive.

According to political scientists Samuel Seitz and Caitlin Talmadge, "The historical record, both before Trump’s presidency and during it, demonstrates that madman tactics typically fail to strengthen deterrence or generate bargaining leverage." They cite three main reasons:  target states fail to receive the message that the "madman" thinks he is sending,  target states do not see the "madman" behavior as credible, and  target states do not give into the "madman" even when they believe the madman rhetoric, because the madman is perceived as being unable to make credible assurances of future behavior.

See also

 Deterrence theory
 Operation Giant Lance
 Brinkmanship
 Good cop/bad cop

Notes

Bibliography
 
 
 

Presidency of Richard Nixon
History of the foreign relations of the United States
Foreign policy doctrines of the United States
Cold War
Nuclear strategy
Vietnam War
Political theories